Roy Harding was a professional baseball pitcher in the Negro leagues. He played with the Atlanta Black Crackers in 1938.

References

External links
 and Seamheads

Atlanta Black Crackers players
Year of birth missing
Year of death missing
Baseball pitchers